Open Arms may refer to:

Songs
"Open Arms" (Journey song), 1981, covered by Celine Dion, Mariah Carey, Younha, Low, and Collin Raye
"Open Arms" (Tina Turner song), 2004
"Open Arms" (SZA song), 2022
"Open Arms", a song by Elbow from the 2011 album Build a Rocket Boys!
"Open Arms", a song by Gary Go from the 2009 album Gary Go
"Open Arms", a song by Lloyd Banks from the 2012 mixtape V.6: The Gift
"Open Arms", a song by Michael W. Smith from the 2006 album Stand
"Open Arms", a song by Tracy Chapman from the 1992 album Matters of the Heart

Other uses
Open Arms (tug), Spanish rescue vessel
Open arms test, which measures laboratory rodent anxiety
Open Arms, a 1990s alias of English musician Graham Turner of Flip & Fill
Open Arms, a detective novel by Vince Cable, 2017